Morgan ap Pasgen was a mid 6th century King of Powys, and a son of Pasgen ap Cyngen.

References 

Monarchs of Powys
House of Gwertherion
6th-century Welsh monarchs